A spot height is an exact point on a map with an elevation recorded beside it that represents its height above a given datum. In the UK this is the Ordnance Datum. Unlike a bench-mark, which is marked by a disc or plate, there is no official indication of a spot height on the ground although, in open country, spot heights may sometimes be marked by cairns. In geoscience, it can be used for showing elevations on a map, alongside contours, bench marks, etc.

See also 
 Surveying
 Benchmark (surveying)
 Triangulation station

References 

Cartography
Geodesy
Surveying
Vertical position